Las Brisas is a big beach of Miranda, Venezuela.

Populated places in Miranda (state)